The Chambre de commerce et d'industrie de Lyon (Chamber of Commerce and Industry of Lyon) is one of the Chambers of Commerce and Industry of the Rhône department in France. Its headquarters is located in Lyon at the Palais de la Bourse. 

It has 8 branches: Tarare, Limonest, Rillieux-la-Pape, Vaulx-en-Velin, Chassieu, Corbas, Givors.  It is also part of the regional chamber of commerce and industry Rhône-Alpes. 

Organizations based in Lyon
Chambers of commerce